Boxing at the 2013 Southeast Asian Games took place at Wunna Theikdi Boxing Indoor Stadium, Naypyidaw, Myanmar between December 8–14.

Medal table

Medalists

Men

Women

Results

Men

46-49 kg

52 kg

56 kg

60 kg

64 kg

69 kg

75 kg

81 kg

Women

45-48 kg

51 kg

54 kg

57 kg

60 kg

64 kg

References

2013 Southeast Asian Games events
Boxing at the Southeast Asian Games
2013 in boxing